Tuomo Kerola (10 August 1957 – 26 May 2006) was a Finnish breaststroke swimmer. He competed in two events at the 1976 Summer Olympics.

References

External links
 

1957 births
2006 deaths
Finnish male breaststroke swimmers
Olympic swimmers of Finland
Swimmers at the 1976 Summer Olympics
People from Kokkola
Sportspeople from Central Ostrobothnia